The American College of Apothecaries (ACA) is an international (United States and Canada) professional association in the field of independent community pharmacy practice. The organization offers continuing education (CE) credits for pharmacists in coordination with the Accreditation Council for Pharmacy Education. In 1977, the ACA helped establish the Joint Commission of Pharmacy Practitioners (JCPP) as a charter member. The ACA is affiliated with the American College of Veterinary Pharmacists (ACVP) and the ACA Research & Education Foundation. The current ACA Chairman is Thomas J. Hunt, RPh, FACA, FACVP, and the ACA President is Ryan Oftebro, PharmD, FACA, FACVP.

History
The ACA was founded in 1940 in Richmond, Virginia. Dissatisfied with the state of the profession of pharmacy at the time, the ACA sought to focus pharmacists on pharmacy practice, rather than merchandising. The ACA recommended that community pharmacies be barred from having lunch counters and soda fountains in their stores.

Services

Compounding
The ACA offers pharmaceutical compounding training courses throughout the United States. The ACA also holds the "Quality Compounding Summit," a conference on topics related to quality assurance methods in pharmaceutical compounding. Courses are also offered at the ACA National Training Laboratory at their headquarters, such as "Compounding for Hormone Replacement Therapy," a 15-hour continuing education program aimed at helping pharmacists provide compounded hormone replacement therapy. Other courses are offered as well through their online portal.

HIV
The ACA is responsible for accrediting the "MichRx HIV Pharmacy Online Certification Training Program," a 5 credit-hour program aimed at training pharmacists to serve patients with HIV in their local communities. It is not to be confused with the American Academy of HIV Medicine's "HIV Pharmacist" program, which provides the post-nominals "AAHIVP" (American Academy of HIV Medicine, HIV Pharmacist).

Politics
Historically, the ACA has opposed allowing pharmacists to substitute generic medications, a position that was at odds with that of the American Pharmacists Association (APhA) in 1972.

References

External links
Official YouTube channel

Organizations based in Richmond, Virginia
1940 establishments in Virginia